Ada Dwyer Russell (1863–1952) was an American actress who performed on stage in Broadway and London and became the muse to her poet lover Amy Lowell.

Brief biography

Dwyer was born in 1863 to a recently baptized Mormon Salt Lake City bookkeeper James Dwyer and his wife Sara Ann Hammer. In 1893 at the age of thirty she married Boston-born actor Harold Russell (lived 1859–1927), and they had a daughter Lorna the next year. Their marriage fell apart soon after Lorna's birth and they entered a lifelong separation, though, never legally divorcing. Although no record exists of Dwyer renouncing the Mormon religion she was raised in, she ceased involvement, and her father was asked to resign in 1913 by top leaders after telling other Salt Lake members that same-sex sexual activity was not a sin.

Dwyer and Lowell

Nearly two decades after separating from Russell, she met writer Amy Lowell in 1912 while on an acting tour in Boston for a play. Dwyer moved in with Lowell in 1914 and their long-term lesbian relationship, or "Boston marriage" (the term for a 19th-century romantic female relationship) would last over a decade until Lowell's death in 1925. Lowell lovingly referred to Dwyer as "the lady of the moon" and loved Dwyer's daughter and grandchildren as her own. Unfortunately, most of the primary document letters of communication between the two were destroyed by Ada at Amy's request, leaving much unknown about the details of their life together as they had to hide the nature of their relationship.

Lowell's love poems

Ada Dwyer Russell was the subject of many of Lowell's poems, and Lowell wanted to dedicate her books to Dwyer who refused except for one time in a non-poetry book in which Lowell wrote, "To A.D.R., This, and all my books. A.L." Examples of these love poems to Dwyer include the Taxi, Absence, In a Garden, Madonna of the Evening Flowers, Opal, and Aubade. Amy admitted to John Livingston Lowes that Dwyer was the subject of her series of romantic poems titled "Two Speak Together". Lowell's poems about Dwyer have been called the most explicit and elegant lesbian love poetry during the time between the ancient Sappho and poets of the 1970s.

References

External links
 The Hervey Allen Papers at the University of Pittsburgh containing correspondence with Dwyer
 

1863 births
1952 deaths
19th-century American actresses
American stage actresses
Bisexual actresses
Bisexual women
LGBT Latter Day Saints
20th-century American actresses
LGBT people from Utah
American LGBT actors